Lake D’Arbonne is a reservoir located near and around the town of Farmerville in Union Parish in north Louisiana. The lake was first conceived in 1957. The 2450-feet long concrete dam was built in 1961 by the Louisiana Department of Public Works and the resulting lake took shape by 1963 behind the 54-feet tall dam. Lake D’Arbonne State Park, a state maintained camping and recreation area, lies on the lake.

The Louisiana State Highway 33 bridge atop Lake D'Arbonne in Farmerville is named for James Peyton Smith, the state representative from Union and Morehouse parishes from 1964 to 1972.

References

External links
Lake D’Arbonne State Park

Reservoirs in Louisiana
Bodies of water of Union Parish, Louisiana